The Boy Who Cried Wolf is the eighth studio album by English singer-songwriter Passenger. It was released on 28 July 2017 on Black Crow Records. The album peaked at number 5 on the UK Albums Chart.

Singles
"Simple Song" and "The Boy Who Cried Wolf" were released as the album's lead singles on 26 July 2017. "Simple Song" did not enter the New Zealand Singles Chart, but peaked at number 9 on the Heatseekers Singles Chart.

Track listing

Charts

Release history

References

2017 albums
Passenger (singer) albums